Kostas Chatzikyriakos (born 14 May 1979) is a Greek football player who plays for Aiolikos F.C. .

He previously played for A.E.L.K in the Gamma Ethniki.

References

External links
Profile at epae.org

1979 births
Living people
Greek footballers
Association football defenders
Aiolikos F.C. players
People from Mytilene
Sportspeople from the North Aegean